Auchinraith is a village in South Lanarkshire, Scotland.

Villages in South Lanarkshire